Doug McCarthy  (born November 4, 1962) is a Canadian former professional ice hockey player and former inline hockey player and coach.

Career 
McCarthy was the captain of the Canada men's national inline hockey team, which won a silver medal at the 1997 IIHF InLine Hockey World Championship, and was the head coach of Canada's team which won gold at the 1998 IIHF InLine Hockey World Championship.

References

External links

1962 births
Living people
Anaheim Bullfrogs players
Canadian ice hockey centres
Cardiff Devils players
Carolina Thunderbirds players
Edmonton Sled Dogs players
Lubbock Cotton Kings players
Milton Keynes Kings players
New Mexico Scorpions (WPHL) players
Phoenix Mustangs players
San Jose Rhinos players
Ice hockey people from Edmonton
Vancouver VooDoo players
Canadian expatriate ice hockey players in England
Canadian expatriate ice hockey players in Wales
Canadian expatriate ice hockey players in the United States
Canadian expatriate ice hockey players in Italy